Pose (stylized as POSE) is an American drama television series about New York City's ballroom culture, an LGBTQ subculture in the African-American and Latino communities, throughout the 1980s and 1990s. Featured characters are dancers and models, who compete for trophies and recognition in this underground culture and who support one another in a network of chosen families known as Houses.

Created by Ryan Murphy, Brad Falchuk, and Steven Canals, the series aired from June 3, 2018, to June 6, 2021, on FX. It stars an ensemble cast including Evan Peters, Kate Mara, James Van Der Beek, Michaela Jaé Rodriguez, Dominique Jackson, Billy Porter, Indya Moore, Ryan Jamaal Swain, Charlayne Woodard, Hailie Sahar, Angelica Ross, Angel Bismark Curiel, Dyllón Burnside, Sandra Bernhard, and Jason A. Rodriguez.

The first season was met with largely positive reception and subsequently received numerous award nominations including the Golden Globe Award for Best Television Series – Drama and the Golden Globe Award for Best Actor – Television Series Drama for Billy Porter. In 2019, Porter was awarded the Primetime Emmy Award for Outstanding Lead Actor in a Drama Series – the first openly gay Black man to be nominated for and win in an Emmy lead acting category. The series was nominated for Outstanding Drama Series at the same ceremony.

The second season premiered on June 11, 2019, to further acclaim. The third and final season premiered on May 2, 2021, and concluded on June 6, 2021, to further positive reviews. On July 13, 2021, Michaela Jaé Rodriguez became the first trans lead ever nominated for the Primetime Emmy Award for Outstanding Lead Actress In A Drama Series.

Premise
Pose is set in 1987–98 and looks at "the juxtaposition of several segments of life and society in New York": the African-American and Latino ball culture world, the downtown social and literary scene, and the rise of the yuppie milieu, and HIV.

Cast and characters

Main

 Evan Peters as Stan Bowes, Patty's yuppie husband who works in Trump Tower and becomes Angel's lover (season 1)
 Kate Mara as Patty Bowes, Stan's wife and mother of their children (season 1)
 James Van Der Beek as Matt Bromley, Stan's kingpin boss (season 1)
 Michaela Jaé Rodriguez as Blanca Rodriguez-Evangelista, a trans woman with HIV/AIDS and former member of the House of Abundance. She is the founder and mother of the House of Evangelista.
 Dominique Jackson as Elektra Evangelista, mother of the former House of Abundance. After brief stints in the Houses of Evangelista and Ferocity, she forms the House of Wintour before rejoining the House of Evangelista in the final season.
 Billy Porter as Prayerful "Pray" Tell, emcee of the balls in New York, fashion designer, and mentor to members of the community, especially the members of the House of Evangelista. He later enters a relationship with Ricky.
 Indya Moore as Angel Vasquez-Evangelista, a trans woman sex worker who joins the House of Evangelista after leaving the House of Abundance. She has an affair with Stan during the first season, before entering a relationship with Papi.
 Ryan Jamaal Swain as Damon Richards-Evangelista, a homeless, talented dancer who becomes the first member of the House of Evangelista. After the season 3 premiere, the character was written out of the show due to the murder of Swain's sister in their hometown of Birmingham, Alabama. Damon was said to have relapsed into alcoholism and moved to his cousin's home in South Carolina. In the series finale, he was revealed to be in Chicago, teaching dancing.
 Charlayne Woodard as Helena St. Rogers, a modern dance teacher at the New School for Dance (season 1; guest, season 2)
 Hailie Sahar as Lulu Evangelista, the founder of the House of Ferocity alongside Candy. She joins the House of Evangelista in the final season.
 Angelica Ross as Candy Johnson-Ferocity, the founder of the House of Ferocity alongside Lulu (seasons 1–2; guest, season 3)
 Angel Bismark Curiel as Esteban "Lil Papi" Martinez-Evangelista, a member of the House of Evangelista
 Dyllón Burnside as Ricky Evangelista, Damon's ex-boyfriend and a former member of the House of Evangelista who joins the House of Wintour. In the final season he rejoins the House of Evangelista.
 Sandra Bernhard as Judy Kubrak, a nurse who works with people with AIDS and member of ACT UP (seasons 2–3; guest, season 1)
 Jason A. Rodriguez as Lemar Khan, a former member of the House of Abundance, Ferocity, Evangelista and Wintour, before becoming the father of the House of Khan (season 3; recurring, seasons 1–2)

Recurring

Introduced in season 1

 Jeremy McClain as Cubby Wintour, a young gay man and a former member of the House of Abundance, Ferocity, and Evangelista, who joins the House of Wintour and later dies in the first episode of season 3
 Alexia Garcia as Aphrodite Ferocity, a trans woman who defects from the House of Xtravaganza to the House of Ferocity
 Bianca Castro as Veronica Ferocity, a thrift store cashier who joins the House of Ferocity
 Samantha Grace Blumm as Amanda Bowes, Stan and Patty's daughter
 Jose Gutierez Xtravaganza as himself, a Judge and member of the real-life House of Xtravaganza
 Johnny Sibilly as Costas Perez, Pray Tell's boyfriend who dies of AIDS
 Jack Mizrahi as himself, a ballroom emcee and member of the Masters of Ceremony Council
 Leiomy Maldonado as Florida Ferocity, a member of the House of Ferocity
Sol Williams (a/k/a Grandfather Sol Pen'davis) as a member of the judges panel. Sol also was in the documentary movie Paris Is Burning (1990), upon which the series is largely based.

Introduced in season 2

 Patti LuPone as Frederica Norman, a wealthy and shady real estate mogul
 Damaris Lewis as Jazmine Wintour, a member of the House of Wintour
 Brielle Rheames as Silhouette Wintour, a member of the House of Wintour
 Dashaun Wesley as Shadow Wintour, a member of the House of Wintour
 Danielle Cooper as Wanda, Judy's girlfriend and member of ACT UP
 Trudie Styler as Eileen Ford, a fashion model agent
 André Ward as Manhattan, a member of the Masters of Ceremony Council
 J. Cameron Barnet as Castle, a member of the Masters of Ceremony Council
 Patricia Black as Chi Chi, Elektra's co-worker at the Hellfire Club

Introduced in season 3
 Jeremy Pope as Christopher, Blanca's caring boyfriend

Notable guest stars

Introduced in season 1

 Clark Jackson as Lawrence Richards ("Pilot"), Damon's father
 Roslyn Ruff as Mrs. Richards ("Pilot"), Damon's mother
 Deidre Goodwin as Wanda Green ("Pilot"), employee at the New School for Dance
 Matt McGrath as Mitchell ("Access"), the manager of Boy Lounge
 Tamara M. Williams as Summer, a trans woman who attempts to seduce Stan ("Access", "The Fever")
 Sol Pendavis Williams as himself ("Access", "Mother of the Year"), a Judge and member of the real-life House of Pendavis
 Kathryn Erbe as Dr. Gottfried ("Giving and Receiving", "The Fever"), Elektra's physician
 Christine Ebersole as Bobbi ("Giving and Receiving"), Patty's mother
 Christopher Meloni as Dick Ford ("The Fever", "Pink Slip"), Elektra's wealthy lover and financier
 Cecilia Gentili as Miss Orlando ("The Fever", "Butterfly/Cocoon"), a shady woman that offers discounted plastic surgery
 Flor de Liz Perez as Carmen Rodriguez ("Mother's Day"), Blanca's sister
 Charles Brice as Darius ("Love Is the Message"), Blanca's love interest
 Our Lady J as Sherilyn ("Love Is the Message", "Love's in Need of Love Today"), a local pianist
 Trace Lysette as Tess Wintour ("Love is the Message", "Worth It"), a clothing store saleswoman who later joins House of Wintour
 Laith Ashley as "Sebastian" ("Love Is the Message"), a sexy participant in one of the ballroom-scenes

Introduced in season 2

 Alexander DiPersia as Andre Taglioni ("Acting Up", "Revelations"), a famed photographer and fetishistic predator
 Edward Carnevale as Jonas Norman ("Worth It", "Love's in Need of Love Today"), Frederica Norman's son
 Blaine Alden Krauss as Chris ("Worth it", "What Would Candy Do?"), dancer and Ricky's former lover
 Peppermint as Euphoria ("Butterfly/Cocoon"), a trans sex worker
 Danny Johnson as Darnell Johnson ("Never Knew Love Like This Before"), Candy's father
 Patrice Johnson Chevannes as Vivica Johnson ("Never Knew Love Like This Before"), Candy's mother
 Austin Scott as Adrian ("Life's a Beach"), a lifeguard and Blanca's love interest
 KJ Aikens as Quincy and Gia Parr as Chilly ("In My Heels"), street kids who Blanca takes under her wing

Introduced in season 3

 Eisa Davis as Angie, Christopher's mother, who has a judgmental behavior towards Blanca
 Curtiss Cook as Thomas, Christopher's father
 Rahne Jones as Leisa, an alcoholism counselor advising Pray Tell
 Noma Dumezweni as Tasha Jackson, Elektra's mother
 Norm Lewis as Vernon Jackson, Pray Tell's former lover, who is a now a pastor
 Anna Maria Horsford as Charlene, Pray Tell's mother
 Janet Hubert as Latrice, Pray Tell's aunt
 Jackée Harry as Jada, Pray Tell's aunt
 Michelle Hurd as Ebony Jackson, Vernon's wife and Pray Tell's childhood best friend
 Jordan Aaron Hall as a young Pray Tell
 Annelise Cepero as Jimena, sister of Lil Papi's ex-girlfriend
 Mark Lotito as Marco Ciccone, a mobster with whom Elektra makes business
 Chris Tardio as Vicent Massino, a mobster with whom Elektra makes business

Episodes

Season 1 (2018)

Season 2 (2019)

Season 3 (2021)

Production

Development
On March 16, 2017, it was announced that FX had given the production a pilot order. The pilot was written by Ryan Murphy, Brad Falchuk, and Steven Canals all of whom were also set to executive produce alongside Nina Jacobson, Brad Simpson, and Sherry Marsh. Production companies involved with the pilot were slated to consist of include FX Productions and Fox21 Television Studios. In October 2018, it was reported that Leiomy Maldonado and Danielle Polanco would be choreographing the series' ball scenes and that Janet Mock and Our Lady J had joined the show's writing and producing staff.

On December 27, 2017, it was announced that FX had given the production a series for a first season consisting of eight episodes. On May 9, 2018, ahead of the series premiere, Murphy announced that he would be donating all of his profits from Pose to non-profit charitable organizations that work with LGBTQ+ people, including the Sylvia Rivera Law Project, the Transgender Legal Defense & Education Fund, and the Callen-Lorde Community Health Center. Murphy explained this decision saying, "The thing that struck me in talking to so many of them, was how much they've struggled, how under attack they feel, how many of them find it difficult getting healthcare, and finding jobs. I just decided I need to do more than just making a show for this community. I want to reach out and help this community." On July 12, 2018, it was announced that the series had been renewed for a second season which premiered on June 11, 2019. On June 17, 2019, FX renewed the series for a third season. In March 2021, FX confirmed the third season would be its last. The final season premiered on May 2, 2021.

Casting

In March 2017, Ryan Murphy and his team began casting for the series. On October 25, 2017, it was announced that transgender actors Michaela Jaé Rodriguez, Indya Moore, Dominique Jackson, Hailie Sahar, and Angelica Ross and cisgender actors Ryan Jamaal Swain, Billy Porter and Dyllón Burnside had been cast in main roles. The series' production team claimed that they had assembled the largest transgender cast ever for a scripted series. The series was expected to include over 50 transgender characters total. On October 26, 2017, it was announced that Evan Peters, Kate Mara, James Van Der Beek, and Tatiana Maslany had also joined the main cast.

On December 27, 2017, it was reported that Maslany had exited the series following the redevelopment of her part into that of a 50-year-old African-American woman. The character was then recast with Charlayne Woodard assuming the role. On September 19, 2018, it was announced that Sandra Bernhard would reprise her role of Nurse Judy in season two as a series regular. On March 23, 2019, at PaleyFest, Ryan Murphy revealed that Patti LuPone would guest star in the second season.

Filming
Production for the pilot began in New York City in October 2017. The following episodes of the first season were expected to begin production in February 2018. Murphy directed the series' first two episodes and Mock directed the sixth, thus making her the first transgender woman of color to write and direct any episode of television. On March 14, 2020, production on the third season was suspended due to the COVID-19 health crisis.
The third and final season's filming wrapped on March 20, 2021.

Release

Marketing

On April 12, 2018, FX released the first teaser trailer for the series. It was also announced that the series was set to premiere on June 3, 2018. On May 3, 2018, the first official trailer was released.

Premiere
On May 17, 2018, the series held its world premiere at the Hammerstein Ballroom in Manhattan. On July 23, 2018, Dyllón Burnside emceed a benefit concert, duetting with co-stars Billy Porter and Ryan Jamaal Swain to celebrate the season one finale, and raise money for GLSEN. During the event, a conversation was held between Burnside and former Vibe editor-in-chief Emil Wilbekin, where Burnside discussed his coming out story and spoke about the importance of safe spaces for LGBTQ people. Later on in the evening, Porter sang from his latest album and Michaela Jaé Rodriguez sang "Waving Through a Window" from Dear Evan Hansen.

In March 2019, the series was part of the Paley Center for Media's annual Paleyfest LA at the Dolby Theatre in Los Angeles, California.

Pose premiered in the United Kingdom on March 21, 2019, on BBC Two.
Season 2 premiered on October 26, 2019, and Season 3 on August 8, 2021. All full series made available on BBC iPlayer straight after each series' premiere.

Influences
While a work of creative fiction, the series is "heavily inspired by" Jennie Livingston's 1990 documentary, Paris Is Burning. Livingston also served as a consulting producer on the show. Several of the houses and characters were based on, or named after, real people, and several people featured in the documentary also made cameos in the series, such as Jose Gutierez Xtravaganza, an icon of the voguing scene, who plays a judge throughout the first series, and Sol Pendavis Williams, of the House of Pendavis. Creators and producers of the series, Murphy, Canals, and writer/producer Janet Mock all considered Paris Is Burning "a text that helped inform not only the show, but also their identities when they first saw it."

Reception

Critical response

Season 1
On the review aggregation website Rotten Tomatoes, the first season holds a 96% approval rating with an average rating of 8.3/10 based on 84 reviews. The website's critical consensus reads, "Charged with energy, poise, and confidence, Pose pirouettes between artistic opulence and deliciously soapy drama to create a fresh new addition to Ryan Murphy's lexicon." Metacritic, which uses a weighted average, assigned the first season a score of 75 out of 100 based on 27 critics, indicating "generally favorable reviews".

In a positive review, Vanity Fairs Richard Lawson was effusive, describing the series as "an engaging portrait of dark days met with merriment. Pain and perseverance are sewn together to create something humble yet fabulous—and, it should be shouted over all the show's loud and glorious clamor, very much long overdue." In a similarly favorable critique, Vultures Matt Zoller Seitz praised the series' ambition, aesthetic, and spotlight on minorities saying, "it shows American audiences a world that has never been visualized on television at this length and at such an obviously grand budget level. The camera swings and swoops, glides and tumbles as in a Scorsese epic like Gangs of New York; in both the outdoor street scenes and indoor crowd scenes, it's obvious that FX has spared no expense to get the clothes, the cars, the streets, the business signs, and even the distinctive yellow-brown glow of streetlights correct." In a more mixed assessment, Newsdays gave the series two-and-a-half stars out of four and described it far less approvingly saying, "good intentions don't always lead to good TV, and a couple episodes in, that appears to be the case with Pose. This certainly isn't bad TV—Murphy isn't about to leave his longtime home with a turkey—but it's often bland TV, and oddly enough, stock TV." In a negative evaluation, Slates Willa Paskin was outright dismissive saying, "It's a TV show from one of the most canny creators working today, yet as a viewing experience it can feel like an object lesson." She continued on specifically criticizing the show's character development saying, "So many of the people on Pose are strong women, trans paragons, and this comes at the expense of them being recognizably flawed human beings."

Season 2
On Rotten Tomatoes, the second season holds a 98% approval rating with an average rating of 8.40/10 based on 41 reviews. The website's critical consensus reads, "A delightful, delicate dance of light and dark, Poses second season achieves a striking balance between the grittiness of reality and the glamour of the runway and shines even brighter." On Metacritic, season 2 holds a score of 79 out of 100 based on 14 critics, indicating "generally favorable reviews."

Season 3
On Rotten Tomatoes, the third season holds a 100% approval rating with an average rating of 7.70/10 based on 29 reviews. The website's critical consensus reads, "Though it's entirely too short, Poses final season is a joyously entertaining celebration of life that is not to be missed." On Metacritic, season 3 holds a score of 76 out of 100 based on 11 critics, indicating "generally favorable reviews."

Ratings

Season 1

Season 2

Season 3

Accolades

See also

 Bros
 Fire Island
 LGBT culture in New York City
 List of LGBT people from New York City
 List of dramatic television series with LGBT characters
 Spoiler Alert

References

External links
 
 
 
Jennie Livingston's 1990 documentary, Paris Is Burning on Youtube

2010s American black television series
Hispanic and Latino American television
2010s American drama television series
2020s American black television series
2020s American drama television series
2018 American television series debuts
2018 in LGBT history
2019 in LGBT history
2021 American television series endings
2021 in LGBT history
2010s American LGBT-related drama television series
2020s American LGBT-related drama television series
LGBT African-American culture
Ball culture
Drag (clothing) television shows
English-language television shows
FX Networks original programming
Gay-related television shows
HIV/AIDS in television
LGBT Hispanic and Latino American culture
Peabody Award-winning television programs
Primetime Emmy Award-winning television series
Prostitution in American television
Television series by 20th Century Fox Television
Television series created by Ryan Murphy (writer)
Television series set in 1987
Television series set in 1988
Television series set in 1990
Television series set in 1991
Television series set in 1994
Television series set in 1996
Television series set in 1998
Television series set in the 1980s
Television series set in the 1990s
Television shows set in New Jersey
Television shows set in New York City
Transgender-related television shows
Television series created by Brad Falchuk
Television productions suspended due to the COVID-19 pandemic
Television Academy Honors winners
LGBT culture in New York City